Subhash Nagar metro station may refer to:

 Subhash Nagar metro station (Delhi)
 Subhash Nagar metro station (Nagpur)
 Subhash Nagar metro station on Kolkata Metro Line 5
 Subhash Nagar metro station on the Jaipur Metro Orange Line